William Sanday  (1 August 1843 – 16 September 1920) was a British Anglican theologian and priest. He was the Dean Ireland's Professor of Exegesis of Holy Scripture from 1883 to 1895 and the Lady Margaret Professor of Divinity from 1895 to 1919; both chairs were at the University of Oxford. He had previously been Master of Bishop Hatfield's Hall, University of Durham.

Biography
Sanday was born in Holme Pierrepont, Nottinghamshire, England, to William Sanday and Elizabeth Mann. He was a British academic theologian and biblical scholar. He was ordained as a deacon in 1867 and as a priest in 1869. In 1877 he married Marian Hastings, daughter of Woodman Hastings.

He was Dean Ireland's Professor of Exegesis of Holy Scripture at Oxford between 1883 and 1895, as well as Lady Margaret Professor of Divinity and Canon of Christ Church between 1895 and 1919. He became a Fellow of the British Academy (FBA) in 1903 (one of the original cohort), and received an honorary Doctor of Letters (DLitt) degree from the University of Cambridge in May 1902.

He also worked as one of the editors of the 1880 Variorum Bible, and contributed articles to the Encyclopaedia Biblica and The American Journal of Theology.

Sanday died on 16 September 1920 in Oxford.

Works 
 
 
 
  1906 2nd edition
 
 
  1920 edition

References

Footnotes

Bibliography

External links 
 
 

1843 births
1920 deaths
Anglican biblical scholars
Dean Ireland's Professors of the Exegesis of Holy Scripture
English Anglican theologians
English biblical scholars
Fellows of the British Academy
Lady Margaret Professors of Divinity
Masters of Hatfield College, Durham
New Testament scholars
People from Rushcliffe (district)
Presidents of the Oxford Union